Kabe Station is the name of two train stations in Japan:

 Kabe Station (Hiroshima) (可部駅)
 Kabe Station (Tokyo) (河辺駅)